Commercium is a legal term relating to ancient Roman law. The term refers to the general rule that the law of a community was for the members of that community only, and that the stranger was without rights. Commercium was the chief of the private rights, which Latin cities had originally not only with Rome but with each other. If a foreigner's city had no treaty to the contrary with the city in which he or she entered, that foreigner could be seized and enslaved then their goods could be taken as  bona vacantia (vacant goods, meaning things found without any apparent owner). Eventually a foreigner could rely upon the  ius gentium (the right of the nations) in lieu of a treaty. Nevertheless, the bond of commercium meant more than this. It meant that the Latin was admitted to the Roman methods of acquiring property and of contracting obligations. In Ulpian's words: "Commercium est emendi vendendique invicem ius" (Commerce is the right of buying and selling with each other) does not quite get across the actual definition of the right of commercium, therefore it must be taken as giving only a rough description of the term.

Commercium Latin Language, noun. I. Proper sense, commercial intercourse, trade, traffic, commerce: II. Metonomy, A. The right to trade, mercantile intercourse, privilege of traffic: B. In General, intercourse, communication, correspondence: III. Figuratively, connection, correspondence, communion, fellowship:.

See also
Roman Law

References

Roman law